Bertram Henry 'Harry' Barrett (10 October 1925 – 30 November 2018) served a number of positions in the Oakville municipal government in Ontario, Canada, eventually being elected mayor of Oakville in 1973 and serving in the position until 1985. Barrett, a plumber by trade, is widely remembered for his centred, pragmatic stance on issues, and influence in the development of the Oakville waterfront.

He died on the morning of 30 November 2018 at his home in Oakville at the age of 93.

See also
List of mayors of Oakville, Ontario

References

 Image of Mayor Barrett (1980s)

1925 births
2018 deaths
Mayors of Oakville, Ontario